Gdańsk Biskupia Górka is a former railway station in Gdańsk, Poland. This station was closed down in 1948.

Lines crossing the station

References 
Gdańsk Biskupia Górka at Polish stations database , URL accessed on 24 January 2006

External links
www.gdansk.pl (Gdańsk official website)
trojmiasto.pl (Tricity website)

Biskupia Gorka
Disused railway stations in Pomeranian Voivodeship
Railway stations closed in 1948